Conus paschalli is a species of sea snail, a marine gastropod mollusk in the family Conidae, the cone snails, cone shells or cones.

These snails are predatory and venomous. They are capable of "stinging" humans.

Description
The size of the shell varies between 19 mm and 27 mm.

Distribution
This marine species of cone snail occurs in the Caribbean Sea off Nicaragua and Honduras.

References

 E.J. Petuch,.The molluscan fauna of the Wawa River region, Miskito Coast, Nicaragua: ecology, biogeographical implications; The Nautilus v. 111 (1998)
 Tucker J.K. & Tenorio M.J. (2013) Illustrated catalog of the living cone shells. 517 pp. Wellington, Florida: MdM Publishing. 
 Puillandre N., Duda T.F., Meyer C., Olivera B.M. & Bouchet P. (2015). One, four or 100 genera? A new classification of the cone snails. Journal of Molluscan Studies. 81: 1-23

External links
 To World Register of Marine Species
 Cone Shells - Knights of the Sea
 

paschalli
Gastropods described in 1998
Fauna of the Caribbean